Vampire: Netherworld is a novel by Richard Lee Byers published by Boxtree Books in 1995.

Plot summary
Vampire: Netherworld is a Vampire: The Masquerade novel about Zane, an ordinary human who finds himself caught up in events beyond his understanding, and only the whim of an ancient vampire, Sartak, saves him from death.

Reception
Andy Butcher reviewed Vampire: Netherworld for Arcane magazine, rating it a 7 out of 10 overall. Butcher comments that "makes for an enjoyable read and offers some insight into areas of the game world that you may not have considered."

Reviews
Review by John D. Owen (1996) in Vector 189

References

1995 novels
Vampire: The Masquerade
World of Darkness novels